Thirteen (stylised as Th1rt3en) is the fifth and final studio album by Robert Miles released on 7 February 2011, the third album he independently recorded and produced. The album's style is a blend of alternative and progressive rock with ambient and electronic soundscapes. It contains 13 instrumental compositions, hence the name of the album. The album was released as a CD and limited edition digipack. The digital version of the album includes an unlisted bonus track. Shortly after the release of the album, the songs "Miniature World", "Deep End", "Black Rubber", and "Antimony" were officially remixed and issued as a side release. The record also produced one single "Miniature World".

Background

Reception
Tom Ewing of The Guardian stated, "When the rhythm picks up – on Black Rubber and Antimony – Thirteen seems far more purposeful. But mostly Miles' liking for placid, limpid keyboard moods fails to gel with all this hefty axework, and much of this record is like a series of swimming pools being jumped in by a series of hippos." David Welsh of Music OMH wrote, "Robert Miles, a law unto himself as his own boss, has taken no shortcuts, and Thirteen, as a result, is as rich and rewarding a musical experience as one could hope to encounter." AllMusic's Jon O'Brien called the album "intriguing and fulfilling listen for his more recent converts."

Track listing

Personnel
 Roberto Concina – arrangements, bass guitar, composer, engineering, keyboards, mixing, production, programming, sound designing
 Toni Economides – engineering, mixing
 Paul Falloon – bass
 Michael Fossenkenper – mastering
 Robert Fripp – electric guitar, keyboards
 Davide Giovannini – drums
 Steve Hussey – string arrangements
 Dave Okumu – electric guitar
 Mike Patto – fender rhodes, keyboards
 Jon Thorne – bass, double bass
 Urban Soul Orchestra – string arrangements

References

External links
Profile of Th1Rt3En at Saltrecords.com

Robert Miles albums
2011 albums